The men's hammer throw event at the 2006 World Junior Championships in Athletics was held in Beijing, China, at Chaoyang Sports Centre on 16 and 18 August.  A 6 kg (junior implement) hammer was used.

Medalists

Results

Final
18 August

Qualifications
16 August

Group A

Group B

Participation
According to an unofficial count, 27 athletes from 18 countries participated in the event.

References

Hammer throw
Hammer throw at the World Athletics U20 Championships